The 1973 Austrian Rally (formally the 44. Austrian Alpine Rally) was the ninth round of the inaugural World Rally Championship season.  Run in mid-September around Baden, Austria, the rally was entirely on gravel surface special stages.  1973 would be the only year to see the WRC hold an event in Austria, despite the strong presence of Austrian drivers in the series through the present.

Report 
In 1973, and for several years afterward, only manufacturers were given points for finishes in WRC events.  Austria hosted BMW's first ever win of the World Rally Championship, with front-runners Alpine-Renault, Saab, and Fiat also making strong bids for points.

Results 

Source: Independent WRC archive

Championship standings after the event

References

External links 
 Official website of the World Rally Championship
 1973 Austrian Rally at Rallye-info 

Austrian
Austrian Alpine Rally
Austrian Alpine Rally, 1973
Austrian Alpine Rally